Alexei Yefimenko (born August 20, 1985) is a Belarusian ice hockey player.

International
Yefimenko competed in the 2013 IIHF World Championship as a member of the Belarus men's national ice hockey team.

He was named to the Belarus men's national ice hockey team for competition at the 2014 IIHF World Championship.

References

External links

1985 births
Living people
Belarusian ice hockey forwards
Buran Voronezh players
GKS Tychy (ice hockey) players
HC Dinamo Minsk players
HC Shakhtyor Soligorsk players
HC Sibir Novosibirsk players
HK Brest players
HK Mogilev players
Metallurg Zhlobin players
People from Slavgorod
Yunost Minsk players